Žuljana is a village on the Pelješac peninsula in southern Dalmatia, Croatia. The population is 235 (census 2011).

References

Populated places in Dubrovnik-Neretva County